Jon Ernest DeGuilio (born 1955) is the Chief United States district judge of the United States District Court for the Northern District of Indiana.

Early life and education 

Born in Hammond, Indiana, DeGuilio earned a Bachelor of Arts degree from the University of Notre Dame in 1977 after first beginning his college career at Purdue University.  He then earned a Juris Doctor from the Valparaiso University School of Law in 1981.

Professional career 

From 1981 until 1989, DeGuilio served as an associate for a Schererville, Indiana law firm, during which time he also served part-time as a deputy prosecutor and public defender for Lake County, Indiana and as a City Councilman (1984–1987) in Hammond. From 1989 until 1993, DeGuilio served as a prosecuting attorney for Lake County and then from 1993 until 1999 he was the United States Attorney for the Northern District of Indiana. In 1999, he served briefly as a partner in the South Bend, Indiana office of the Barnes & Thornburg law firm before taking a job with Peoples Bank SB/NorthWest Indiana Bancorp in 1999.  From 1999 until 2001, he served as a senior vice president and trust officer, and from 2001 was the bank's general counsel and corporate secretary until becoming a federal judge.

Federal judicial service 

In January 2009, DeGuilio informed Indiana Senator Evan Bayh of his interest in a vacant federal district judgeship. On January 20, 2010, President Obama nominated DeGuilio to the position, which was vacated by Judge Allen Sharp, who took senior status in November 2007 and died in 2009. On March 4, 2010, the United States Senate Committee on the Judiciary voted to send DeGuilio's nomination to the full Senate. On May 11, 2010, the full Senate confirmed DeGuilio in a voice vote. He received his judicial commission on May 13, 2010. He became Chief Judge on June 1, 2020.

References

Sources 

1955 births
Living people
Judges of the United States District Court for the Northern District of Indiana
People from Hammond, Indiana
People from Lake County, Indiana
People from Schererville, Indiana
Public defenders
United States Attorneys for the Northern District of Indiana
United States district court judges appointed by Barack Obama
21st-century American judges
University of Notre Dame alumni
Valparaiso University School of Law alumni